Stain Davie (born 23 September 1997) is a Malawian professional footballer who plays as a striker for the Malawian club Silver Strikers, and the Malawi national team.

Career
Davie began his career with TN Stars FC, before moving to Mozambique with Vilankulo in April 2019. He moved to TN Stars, before again transferring out to Silver Strikers on 23 February 2020.

International career
Davie was part of the Malawi squad the 2021 Africa Cup of Nations. He debuted with Malawi in the tournament in a 2–1 quarterfinal loss to Morocco on 25 January 2022.

References

External links
 
 

1997 births
Living people
Malawian footballers
Malawi international footballers
Association football forwards
2021 Africa Cup of Nations players
Moçambola players
Malawian expatriate footballers
Malawian expatriates in Mozambique
Expatriate footballers in Mozambique